The 2021–22 Zambia Super League, known as the MTN/FAZ Super Division for sponsorship purposes, was the 61st season of the top-tier football league of Zambia which ran from 11 September 2021 to 8 May 2022.

ZESCO United were the defending champions, having won their 9th title the previous season, but they got succeeded by Red Arrows, who claimed their 2nd league title and first since 2004.

Teams
The league consists of 18 teams, including 15 teams from the previous season and promoted teams, Kafue Celtic of Lusaka and Chambishi F.C.; the latter returning to the top flight after an 11-year absence.

Standings

Results

References

External links
2021–22 League season summary at Soccerstats.com
2021–22 League season stats at Archive.today/Archive.ph
2021–22 League season summary via RSSSF

Zambia Super League
2021–22 in Zambian football
2021–22 in African association football leagues